Horsebridge is a small village in the civil parish of King's Somborne in the Test Valley district of Hampshire, England. Its nearest town is Stockbridge, which lies approximately 3.6 miles (5.2 km) north-east from the village. The village has one pub, named the John O'Gaunt Inn.

The village formerly had its own railway station, which ran between Romsey and Andover on the Sprat and Winkle Line, but this was closed down in 1962.

References

Villages in Hampshire
Test Valley